Sierra Leone Cricket Association is the official governing body of the sport of cricket in Sierra Leone. Its current headquarters is located in Brookfields National Stadium. The Association is Sierra Leone's representative at the International Cricket Council and is an associate member and has been a member of that body since 2002. It is also a member of the African Cricket Association.

History
The game was introduced to the nation by the British Royal Artillery forces in places like schools and other institutions. The Sierra Leone Grammar School and the Methodist Boys High School were the first schools to play the sport in Freetown. Bo government secondary school,which was founded in 1906 became the first school to play it in the provinces.The country first played International matches against Gambia in 1935.West African inter colonial tournaments were also played since the 1930s.Later Nigeria and Ghana also joined the teams and reformed the inter colonial tournament into a four-sided West African tournament which started in 1967 and was held with irregular breaks.The tournament was replaced with a new North Western Conference conference NWACC in 2006. 

In 2009 their Under-19 team qualified for the  ICC U-19 World Cup 2010 qualifying tournament in September the same year after finishing second in the Africa Under-19 Championship in Zambia  in the process beating more established associate in the  African cricket teams, however they could not participate as they couldn't reach the host nation Canada  due to visa issues

References

External links
Cricinfo-Sierra Leone

Cricket administration
Sports governing bodies in Sierra Leone